The history of contract bridge, one of the world's most popular partnership card games, may be dated from the early 16th-century invention of trick-taking games such as whist. Bridge departed from whist with the creation of Biritch (or "Russian Whist") in the 19th century, and evolved through the late 19th and early 20th centuries to form the present game.

Origins
According to the Oxford English Dictionary, the word bridge is the English pronunciation of the game called "biritch". It followed on from whist, which initially was the dominant trick-playing game and enjoyed a loyal following for centuries. The oldest known reference to the rules of the game dates from 1886 and calls it "Biritch, or Russian Whist". The game featured several significant developments from whist: dealer chose the trump suit, or nominated his partner to do so; there was a call of no trumps (biritch); and the dealer's partner's hand became dummy. There were other similarities to bridge: points were scored above and below the line; the score could be doubled and redoubled; scoring a game in one deal required 3  in no trumps, 4 in hearts, or 5 in diamonds (although it could not be done at all, undoubled, in clubs or spades); and there were slam bonuses.

Despite the popularity of whist, this game, and variants of it, bridge  and bridge-whist, became popular in the United States and the UK in the 1890s.

In 1904 auction bridge, known for a time as royal auction bridge, was developed where the players bid in a competitive auction to decide the contract and declarer. The object became to make at least as many tricks as were contracted for and penalties were introduced for failing to do so.

The modern game of contract bridge was the result of innovations to the scoring of auction bridge made by Harold Stirling Vanderbilt and others. The most significant change was that only the tricks contracted for were counted below the line towards game and slam. That made bidding much more challenging and interesting. Another innovation was the concept of vulnerability, a difference in the sizes of penalties incurred and bonuses won by partnerships that have or have not won one game. That discouraged sacrifice bidding to protect the lead in a rubber. Some other scores were adjusted to produce a more balanced game. Vanderbilt set out his rules in 1925, and within a few years contract bridge had so supplanted other forms of the game that "bridge" became synonymous with "contract bridge."

See also 

History of the Laws of Contract Bridge

References

External links
"Biritch, or Russian Whist" by John Collinson (1886), internet edition by John McLeod (2007). — This provides useful detail not in wikisource:Biritch, or Russian Whist and it appears to be a more faithful reproduction.
"History of Bridge". Singapore Contract Bridge Association reprint from The Official Encyclopedia of Bridge.
Brief history of contract bridge

Contract bridge
History of games